The International Internet Preservation Consortium is an international organization of libraries and other organizations established to coordinate efforts to preserve internet content for the future.  It was founded in July 2003 by 12 participating institutions, and had grown to 35 members by January 2010. As of January 2022, there are 52 members.

Membership is open to archives, museums, libraries (including national libraries), and cultural heritage institutions.

Members

National libraries 

Participating national libraries and archives include:

 Austrian National Library
 Biblioteca Nacional de España
 Bibliotheca Alexandrina (Egypt)
 Bibliothèque et Archives nationales du Québec
 Bibliothèque nationale de France
 British Library
 German National Library
 Library and Archives Canada
 Library of Congress
 National and University Library in Zagreb
 National and University Library of Iceland
 National and University Library of Slovenia
 National Diet Library (Japan)
 National Library Board of Singapore
 National Library of Australia
 National Library of Catalonia
 National Library of Chile
 National Library of China
 National Library of the Czech Republic
 National Library of Estonia
 National Library of Finland
 National Library of Greece
 National Library of Ireland
 National Library of Korea
 National Library of Latvia
 National Library of Luxembourg
 National Library of the Netherlands
 National Library of New Zealand
 National Library of Norway
 National Library of Poland
 National Library of Scotland
 National Library of Serbia
 National Library of Sweden
 National Széchényi Library
 Polish State Archives
 Swiss National Library
 The National Archives (United Kingdom) 
 The Royal Danish Library
 Royal Library of Belgium

Participating organisations 

Other participating organizations include:

 Archiefweb.eu
 Arquivo.pt - Portuguese Web Archive
 Columbia University Libraries
 Hanzo 
 Harvard Library
 Internet Archive
 Institut national de l'audiovisuel
 Los Alamos National Laboratory Research Library
 Netherlands Institute for Sound and Vision
 Old Dominion University Department of Computer Science
 Stanford University Libraries
 University Library, Bratislava
 University of North Texas Libraries

Past members 

WebCite used to be, but is no longer, a member of the IIPC. In a 2012 message, its founder Gunther Eysenbach commented that "WebCite has no funding, and IIPC charges 4000 Euro/yr in membership fees."

Projects
The IIPC sponsors and collaborates on a number of different projects with its member organizations.

Current projects
 Support for transitioning to pywb (Python Wayback).
 Collaborative Collections: IIPC members are collaborating to build public web archive collections based on transnational themes or events of mutual interest. Topics of existing collections include: European Refugee Crisis, Intergovernmental Organizations, Olympics, World War I Commemoration, Climate Change, Artificial Intelligence, and Novel Coronavirus (COVID-19).
 Memento: aggregate metadata of the IIPC archives and provide access to Memento.

IIPC also maintains an electronic mailing list open to anyone interested in issues associated with web harvesting, archiving, and quality maintenance issues.

Past projects
 Developing Bloom Filters for Web Archives’ Holdings.
 Improving the Dark and Stormy Archives Framework by Summarizing the Collections of the National Library of Australia
 LinkGate: Core Functionality and Future Use Cases.
 Asking questions with web archives – introductory notebooks for historians: The project output is a set of 16 Jupyter notebooks that demonstrate how specific historical research questions can be explored by analysing data from web archives.    
 IIPC sponsored a project on "cross-archival search strategies" which included the creation of an archive focused on the 2010 Winter Olympics.
 Starting in 2006, the National Library of New Zealand and the British Library developed the Web Curator Tool, an open-source workflow management system for selective web archiving.  Version 1.6 was released on December 5, 2012, and is available at SourceForge. The Web Curator Tool is built upon Java technologies such as Apache Tomcat, the Spring Framework and Hibernate, and Internet Archives  technologies such as the Heritrix web archiving crawler, the NutchWAX web archive full-text search engine and the Wayback Machine.
 IIPC Web Archiving Doctoral Support Award: grant to provide three years of funding for a student to earn a PhD in Interdisciplinary Information Science at The University of North Texas College of Information.  
 IIPC Member Staff Exchange: onsite training by experts for participating IIPC members to use Heritrix 3 web crawler. 
 Working group on Statistics and Quality Indicators for Web Archiving: development of guidelines on the management and evaluation of Web archiving activities and products.

References

External links
International Internet Preservation Consortium

Web archiving initiatives
Online archives
Aggregation-based digital libraries
Organizations established in 2003
Public commons
Computer network organizations
Internet-related organizations
Library consortia
History of the Internet